Mark Pulisic (born September 20, 1968) is an American soccer former footballer and coach who is currently the assistant manager of Pittsburgh Riverhounds SC in the USL Championship.

College
Pulisic attended George Mason University, where he played soccer from 1986 to 1989. He finished with thirty-five career goals in 73 appearances. In 2012, he was voted into the George Mason Men's Soccer Hall of Fame.

Harrisburg Heat
In 1991, Pulisic turned professional with the Harrisburg Heat of the National Professional Soccer League (NPSL). He remained with the Heat throughout his career, retiring from playing professionally in 1999. When he retired, the Heat honored him with a Mark Pulisic Night at the Farm Show Arena in Harrisburg, Pennsylvania. He was then inducted into the team's Hall of Fame, joining Bob Lilley, Richard Chinapoo, and Todd Smith.

Coaching
In 1993, Lebanon Valley College hired Pulisic to begin a new chapter of the men's soccer program, where he coached until 2005. In 1996, Pulisic began coaching a new women's team program at the school as well. While with Lebanon Valley College, Pulisic also served as an assistant coach for the Harrisburg City Islanders of the USL in 2003 and 2004.

On April 19, 2006, the expansion Detroit Ignition of the Major Indoor Soccer League (MISL) hired Pulisic as the team's first coach. In April 2007, he was named the MISL Coach of the Year. On November 6, 2007, former Heat teammate Bob Lilley replaced Pulisic as head coach of the Ignition, moving Pulisic to the front office as director of soccer operations.

Pulisic relocated to Germany in 2015 after his son Christian was signed by Bundesliga club Borussia Dortmund, and was hired as a coach for Dortmund's U10 academy team. In early 2017, Pulisic returned to the United States, joining second division club Rochester Rhinos as an assistant coach under his former teammate and colleague Bob Lilley.

Personal life
Mark Pulisic's father is originally from the island of Olib in Croatia.

Mark Pulisic is the father of Chelsea and U.S. men's national team player Christian Pulisic. His nephew Will Pulisic plays for Major League Soccer club Austin FC.

Honors
Individual
MISL Coach of the Year: 2007

References

External links

 "Mark Pulisic Named Assistant Coach" (Pittsburgh Riverhounds, January 5, 2018)
 
 

1968 births
Living people
American soccer players
National Professional Soccer League (1984–2001) players
Harrisburg Heat players
American people of Croatian descent
American soccer coaches
George Mason Patriots men's soccer players
Major Indoor Soccer League (2001–2008) coaches
Association football forwards
Pittsburgh Riverhounds SC coaches
Association football coaches